Homalopoma baculum, common name the berry dwarf turban, is a species of small sea snail with calcareous opercula, a marine gastropod mollusk in the family Colloniidae.

Description
The height of the shell varies between 3.5 mm and 8 mm. The small, rufous ashy shell has a depressed-globose shape. It is solid and imperforate. It contains four slightly convex whorls that are rapidly increasing. The sculpture is obsoletely but regularly spirally striate. The large aperture is oblique and deflexed above.

Distribution
This common marine species occurs between tides and under rocks in the Salish Sea, Northwest America to Baja California, Mexico.

References

External links
 To Barcode of Life (2 barcodes)
 To Biodiversity Heritage Library (3 publications)
 To Encyclopedia of Life
 To USNM Invertebrate Zoology Mollusca Collection
 To USNM Invertebrate Zoology Mollusca Collection
 To ITIS
 To World Register of Marine Species
 

Colloniidae
Gastropods described in 1864